Claudia Ciardone (born in 1980) is an Argentine model, theatre actress and vedette who started her career after being the first person to be eliminated in Big Brother season 4 in Argentina, she had a relationship with Ricardo "El comandante" Fort.  She was born in Loma Hermosa, Argentina.

Theatre 
On November 2, 2012, the actress made an appearance for the river border state of Argentina to Uruguay, Entre Ríos Province in the Astros theater where she and many other theater artist presented Entre Ríos' summer theatrical season debut for 2012 and 2013. Ciardone will be one of the lead actresses in the comedy theatre, "La noche de las pistolas frías".

2010: Fortuna - (Actress and Vedette) Covering Virginia Gallardo
2010-11: Fortuna 2 - (Actress and Vedette)
2011-12: Mi novio, mi novia y yo - (Lead Actress) Teatro Libertad (Córdoba) Ricardo Fort with Beatriz Salomón, Cristina del Valle, Jorge Martínez, Adriana Salgueiro, Jean François Casanova, Gabriela Figueroa, Jacobo Winograd
2012-13 : La noche de las pistolas frías - (Lead Actress) Teatro Astros (Entre Ríos) Mónica Farro, Marcos "Bicho" Gómez, Santiago Bal, Emilio Disi, Florencia "Floppy" Tesouro, Mabel de Luca, Manuel Navarrete, Carlos Moreno, Campi, Cristina Alberó, Luly Drozdek

Patinando por un Sueño 2008 
In 2008 Ciardone participated in "Patinando por un Sueño/Skating for a Dream", the alternative version of Argentinas adaptation of Dancing with the Stars, Bailando por un Sueño in ShowMatch, hosted by Marcelo Tinelli.

Sources

References

External links
 

1980 births
Living people
People from Buenos Aires
Argentine actresses
Argentine stage actresses
Argentine female models
Argentine female dancers
Argentine television personalities
Women television personalities
Gran Hermano (Argentine TV series) contestants
Argentine entertainers
Argentine vedettes
Argentine musical theatre actresses
Argentine musical theatre female dancers
21st-century Argentine women